G. marginata may refer to:
 Glomeris marginata, a common pill millipede species found in Europe
 Glyptopleura marginata, a plant species

See also